Greg & Steve are a musical duo based in Los Angeles, California. The duo, composed of Greg Scelsa (born October 29, 1947) and Steve Millang (born May 10, 1947), has been performing and recording children's music since the late 1970s. Scelsa and Millang both perform as vocalists and guitarists.<ref name="mccormick">{{cite journal |title=Vets Greg & Steve are still Rockin''' |author=McCormick, Moira |journal=Billboard Magazine |date=1996-06-22 |volume=108 |issue=25}}</ref> They have recorded 20 albums, one music video compilation, and one live concert DVD. Greg & Steve are marketed toward children from preschool age through primary school and have sold more than 4 million albums, making them the best selling children's music duo in the United States.  They also have a rigorous concert schedule, playing an average of 100 shows per year including venues such as Carnegie Hall.

Scelsa and Millang, who have known each other since high school, moved from their hometown of Newport Beach, California to Los Angeles to "be closer to the music business" in 1968.  They took jobs as special education assistants, and soon started performing music for the children, many of whom had emotional or behavioral problems. They found that their music had a positive effect on children with disorders such as autism. For the next several years, they performed their music program for different schools. In 1975, they decided to form a record company, Youngheart Records, and presented a recording of their music to National Association for the Education of Young Children convention attendees. After receiving a positive reaction at the conference, Scelsa and Millang formed "Greg & Steve" and began selling their recordings in the educational market.

In 1991, Scelsa and Millang sold the majority interest of Youngheart Records to Creative Teaching Press and have expanded into internet and retail sales. The expansion allowed them to begin selling their music in larger markets such as retailers Barnes & Noble, and allowed them to focus on their music rather than on business tasks. As of 2002, Greg & Steve have received nine Parents' Choice Awards. In 2010, their album Jumpin' and Jammin was nominated for a Grammy Award for Best Musical Album for Children.

Discography
 1975: We All Live Together, Vol. 1 1978: We All Live Together, Vol. 2 1979: We All Live Together, Vol. 3 1980: We All Live Together, Vol. 4 1983: On the Move 1983: Quiet Moments 1985: Kidding Around 1987: Kids in Motion 1989: Holidays & Special Times 1991: Playing Favorites 1991: Greg & Steve Live! in Concert 1993: Greg and Steve Musical Adventures  (music video compilation)
 1994:  We All Live Together, Vol. 5 1995: Rockin' Down the Road 1997: Big Fun (which won a Children's Music Web Award in 1998)
 2000: Kids in Action 2002: Fun & Games 2004: Ready Set Move 2006: Shake, Rattle & Rock 2006: Greg & Steve: Live in Concert for Children DVD 2007: Sing and Read with Greg & Steve 2009: Jumpin' and Jammin' 2010: Bounce & Boogie (2013 Creative Child Award Winner)
 2021: Get Up & DanceTrack listing

Track listing

Track listing

Track listing

Track listing

Track listing

Track listing

Track listing

Track listing

Track listing

Track listing

References

External links

Interview with Greg and Steve about how they reach children through their music, All About Kids! TV Series'' #203 (1995)

Musical groups from Los Angeles
American musical duos
American children's musical groups